The ornate pitta (Pitta concinna) is a species of bird in the family Pittidae. It is found in Indonesia.  Its natural habitat is subtropical or tropical moist lowland forest.  It is threatened by habitat loss.

References

External links

ornate pitta
Birds of Indonesia
ornate pitta